The Coupe du Président de la République is the top knockout tournament of the Burundian football.

Winners

 1982: Vital'O FC
 1983: Inter FC
 1984: Inter FC
 1985: Vital'O FC
 1986: Vital'O FC
 1987: Muzinga FC
 1988: Vital'O FC
 1989: Vital'O FC
 1990: AS Inter Star ou Inter FC
 1991: Vital'O FC
 1992: Prince Louis FC
 1993: Vital'O FC
 1994: Vital'O FC
 1995: Vital'O FC
 1996: Vital'O FC
 1997: Vital'O FC
 1998: Elite FC
 1999: Vital'O FC
 2000: Athlético Olympic FC
 2001: unknown
 2002: unknown
 2003: unknown
 2004: unknown
 2005: unknown
 2006: unknown
 2007: unknown
 2008: unknown
 2009: unknown
 2010: unknown

Coupe du Président de la République

Coupe de la Confédération

Coupe du Président de la République
 2014: LLB Académic 1-1 (4-3 pen) Le Messager Ngozi
 2015: Vital'O FC 2-2 (4-3 pen) Athlético Olympic FC
 2016: Le Messager Ngozi 1-1 (aet, 4-3 pen) Vital'O FC
 2017: Olympique Star 2-1 Le Messager Ngozi
 2018: Vital'O FC 3-1 Delta Star
 2019: Aigle Noir Makamba FC 3-1 Rukinzo FC
 2020: Musongati FC 1-1 (aet, 5-4 pen) Rukinzo FC
 2021: Bumamuru FC 3-1 Flambeau du Centre

References

Football competitions in Burundi
National association football cups